Kiss Me is a 2014 American romantic drama film. It stars Sarah Bolger and Emily Osment and was directed by Jeff Probst.

Plot
The story follows two 15-year-old girls, Zoe and Shelby. Zoe is diagnosed with scoliosis and has to wear a back brace for a few years, which leads to problems in her life. She is attracted to an older man; a photographer called Chance. She babysits for him and his wife Vera. Shelby, on the other hand, has problems at home. Her father is an alcoholic and is abusive towards her and her mother. Shelby and Zoe cross paths at school, and through the physical and emotional growing pains in their lives, they test the limits of their friendship and develop a relationship that will change their lives forever. When Shelby's mom sees the two girls kissing each other, Zoe is forbidden from seeing Shelby anymore. Vera finds out about the affair between Zoe and Chance and stops hiring her as a babysitter. Three years pass and Shelby marries, with Zoe watching at the wedding. Chance visits Zoe at her work and invites her over while Vera and the kids are out on a trip, where Zoe realizes she can't be with Chance. In the ending scene, Shelby visits Zoe briefly before Zoe leaves for college. Shelby tells Zoe that people have to do what they need to do, but that a piece of her heart will always be with Zoe.

Cast
 Emily Osment as Shelby
 Jenna Fischer as Vera
 Sarah Bolger as Zoe
 John Corbett as Chance
 Missi Pyle as Pam
 Currie Graham as Dr. Craig
 Rita Wilson as Edith
 Jes Macallan as Erica
 Steven Weber as Arthur
 Geoffrey Blake as George
 Emily Bicks as Colleen
 Davenia McFadden as Nurse Sylvie
 Casey J Adler as Evan
 Ralph Votrian as Dr Vollbracht

Production

Casting
On February 9, 2012, it was confirmed that Jenna Fischer, Rita Wilson, Steven Weber, Davenia McFadden and John Corbett joined the cast. It was also announced that Irish actress Sarah Bolger and Emily Osment were cast in the lead roles.

Filming
The film was shot in Los Angeles in early February 2012, and was released almost 2 and a half years later on the 5th of July 2014.

References

External links
 

2014 romantic drama films
2014 television films
2014 films
American romantic drama films
American drama television films
2010s English-language films
2010s American films
American LGBT-related films
Bisexuality-related films
LGBT-related drama films